The war crimes and crimes against humanity which were perpetrated by Soviet Russia/the Soviet Union and its armed forces from 1919 to 1991 include acts which were committed by the Red Army (later called the Soviet Army) as well as acts which were committed by the country's secret police, NKVD, including its Internal Troops. In many cases, these acts were committed upon the orders of the Soviet leaders Vladimir Lenin and Joseph Stalin in pursuance of the early Soviet government's policy of Red Terror. In other instances they were committed without orders by Soviet troops against prisoners of war or civilians of countries that had been in armed conflict with the USSR, or they were committed during partisan warfare.

A significant number of these incidents occurred in Northern, Central, and Eastern Europe recently before, and during, the aftermath of World War II, involving summary executions and the mass murder of prisoners of war, such as in the Katyn massacre and mass rape by troops of the Red Army in territories they occupied.

When the Allies of World War II founded the post-war International Military Tribunal to examine war crimes committed during the conflict by Nazi Germany, with officials from the Soviet Union taking an active part in the judicial processes, there was no examination of the Allied forces' actions and no charges were ever brought against their troops, because they were undefeated powers which then held Europe under military occupation, marring the historical authority of the Tribunal's activity as being, in part, victor's justice.

In the 1990s and 2000s, war crimes trials held in the Baltic states led to the prosecution of some Russians, mostly in absentia, for crimes against humanity committed during or shortly after World War II, including killings or deportations of civilians. Today, the Russian government engages in historical negationism. Russian media refers to the Soviet crimes against humanity and war crimes as a "Western myth". In Russian history textbooks, the atrocities are either altered to portray the Soviets positively or omitted entirely. In 2017, Russian President Vladimir Putin, himself a war crime fugitive since 2023, while acknowledging the "horrors of Stalinism", criticized the "excessive demonization of Stalin" by "Russia's enemies".

Background
The Soviet Union did not recognize Imperial Russia's signing of the Hague Conventions of 1899 and 1907 as binding, and as a result, it refused to recognize them until 1955. This created a situation in which war crimes by the Soviet armed forces could eventually be rationalized, and also gave Nazi Germany a legal fig leaf for the atrocities it committed against Soviet prisoners of war.

Before World War II

Red Army and pogroms
The early Soviet leaders publicly denounced anti-Semitism, William Korey wrote: "Anti-Jewish discrimination had become an integral part of Soviet state policy ever since the late thirties." Efforts were made by Soviet authorities to contain anti-Jewish bigotry notably during the Russian Civil War, whenever the Red Army units perpetrated pogroms, as well as during the Soviet invasion of Poland in 1919–1920 at Baranovichi. Only a small number of pogroms were attributed to the Red Army, with the majority of the 'collectively violent' acts in the period having been committed by anti-communist and nationalist forces.

The pogroms were condemned by the Red Army high command and guilty units were disarmed, while individual pogromists were court-martialed. Although pogroms by Ukrainian units of the Red Army still occurred even after this, Jews regarded the Red Army as the only force which was willing to protect them. It is estimated that 3,450 Jews or 2.3 percent of the Jewish victims killed during the Russian Civil War were murdered by the Bolshevik armies. In comparison, according to the Morgenthau Report, a total of about 300 Jews died in all incidents involving Polish responsibility. The commission also found that the Polish military and civil authorities did their best to prevent such incidents and their recurrence in the future. The Morgenthau report stated that some forms of discrimination against Jews were of a political rather than an anti-Semitic nature and it specifically avoided using the term "pogrom", noting that the term's use was applied to a wide range of excesses, and it also had no specific definition.

The Red Army and the NKVD

On 6 February 1922, the Cheka (All-Russian Extraordinary Commission) secret police was replaced by the State Political Administration or OGPU, a section of the NKVD. The declared function of the NKVD was to protect the state security of the Soviet Union, which was accomplished by the large scale political persecution of "class enemies". The Red Army often gave support to the NKVD in the implementation of political repressions. As an internal security force and a prison guard contingent of the Gulag, the Internal Troops repressed political dissidents and engaged in war crimes during periods of military hostilities throughout Soviet history. They were specifically responsible for maintaining the political regime in the Gulag and conducting mass deportations and forced resettlement. The latter targeted a number of ethnic groups that the Soviet authorities presumed to be hostile to its policies and likely to collaborate with the enemy, including Chechens, Crimean Tatars, and Koreans.

World War II
War crimes by Soviet armed forces against civilians and prisoners of war in the territories occupied by the USSR between 1939 and 1941 in regions including Western Ukraine, the Baltic states and Bessarabia in Romania, along with war crimes in 1944–1945, have been ongoing issues within these countries. Since the dissolution of the Soviet Union, a more systematic, locally controlled discussion of these events has taken place.

Targets of Soviet atrocities included both collaborators with Germany after 1941 and the members of anti-communist resistance movements such as the Ukrainian Insurgent Army (UPA) in Ukraine, the Forest Brothers in Estonia, Latvia and Lithuania, and the Polish Armia Krajowa. The NKVD also conducted the Katyn massacre, summarily executing over 20,000 Polish military officer prisoners and intelligentsia in April and May 1940.

The Soviets deployed mustard gas bombs during the Soviet invasion of Xinjiang. Civilians were killed by conventional bombs during the invasion.

Estonia

In accordance with the German-Soviet Molotov–Ribbentrop Pact, Estonia was annexed by the Soviet Union on 6 August 1940 and renamed the Estonian Soviet Socialist Republic. The Estonian standing army was broken up, its officers executed or deported. In 1941, some 34,000 Estonians were drafted into the Red Army, of whom less than 30% survived the war. No more than half of those men were used for military service. The rest were sent to labour battalions where around 12,000 died, mainly in the early months of the war. After it became clear that the German invasion of Estonia would be successful, political prisoners who could not be evacuated were executed by the NKVD, so that they would not be able to make contact with the Nazi government. More than 300,000 citizens of Estonia, almost a third of the population at the time, were affected by deportations, arrests, execution and other acts of repression. As a result of the Soviet occupation, Estonia permanently lost at least 200,000 people or 20% of its population to repression, exodus and war.

Soviet political repressions in Estonia were met by an armed resistance by the Forest Brothers, composed of former conscripts into the German military, Omakaitse militia and volunteers in the Finnish Infantry Regiment 200 who fought a guerrilla war, which was not completely suppressed until the late 1950s. In addition to the expected human and material losses suffered due to the fighting, until its end this conflict led to the deportation of tens of thousands of people, along with hundreds of political prisoners and thousands of civilians died.

Mass deportations

On 14 June 1941, and the following two days, 9,254 to 10,861 people, mostly urban residents, of them over 5,000 women and over 2,500 children under 16, 439 Jews (more than 10% of the Estonian Jewish population) were deported, mostly to Kirov Oblast, Novosibirsk Oblast or prisons. Deportations were predominantly to Siberia and Kazakhstan by means of railroad cattle cars, without prior announcement, while deported were given few night hours at best to pack their belongings and separated from their families, usually also sent to the east. The procedure was established by the Serov Instructions. Estonians residing in Leningrad Oblast had already been subjected to deportation since 1935.

Destruction battalions

In 1941, to implement Stalin's scorched earth policy, destruction battalions were formed in the western regions of the Soviet Union. In Estonia, they killed thousands of people including a large proportion of women and children, while burning down dozens of villages, schools and public buildings. A school boy named Tullio Lindsaar had all of the bones in his hands broken then was bayoneted for hoisting the flag of Estonia. Mauricius Parts, son of the Estonian War of Independence veteran Karl Parts, was doused in acid. In August 1941, all residents of the village of Viru-Kabala were killed including a two-year-old child and a six-day-old infant. A partisan war broke out in response to the atrocities of the destruction battalions, with tens of thousands of men forming the Forest Brothers to protect the local population from these battalions. Occasionally, the battalions burned people alive. The destruction battalions murdered 1,850 people in Estonia. Almost all of them were partisans or unarmed civilians.

Another example of the destruction battalions' actions is the Kautla massacre, where twenty civilians were murdered and tens of farms destroyed. Many of the people were killed after torture. The low toll of human deaths in comparison with the number of burned farms is due to the Erna long-range reconnaissance group breaking the Red Army blockade on the area, allowing many civilians to escape.

Latvia

On 23 August 1939, the Soviet Union and Germany signed the Molotov-Ribbentrop non-aggression agreement. Latvia was included in the Soviet sphere of interest. On 17 June 1940, Latvia was occupied by Soviet forces. The Kārlis Ulmanis government was removed, and new illegitimate elections were held on 21 June 1940 with only one party listed, "electing" a fake parliament which made resolution to join the Soviet Union, with the resolution having already been drawn up in Moscow prior the election. Latvia became part of the Soviet Union on 5 August, and on 25 August all people in Latvia became citizens of the Soviet Union. The Ministry of Foreign affairs was closed isolating Latvia from the rest of the world.

On 14 June 1941, thousands of people were taken from their homes, loaded onto freight trains and taken to Siberia. Whole families, women, children and old people were sent to labor camps in Siberia. The crime was perpetrated by the Soviet occupation regime on the orders of high authorities in Moscow. Prior the deportation, the Peoples Commissariat established operational groups who performed arrests, search and seizure of the property. Arrests took place in all parts in Latvia including rural areas.

Lithuania

Lithuania, and the other Baltic States, fell victim to the Molotov–Ribbentrop Pact. This agreement was signed between the USSR and Germany in August 1939; leading first to Lithuania being invaded by the Red Army on 15 June 1940, and then to its annexation and incorporation into the Soviet Union on 3 August 1940. The Soviet annexation resulted in mass terror, the denial of civil liberties, the destruction of the country's economic system and the suppression of Lithuanian culture. Between 1940 and 1941, thousands of Lithuanians were arrested and hundreds of political prisoners were arbitrarily executed. More than 17,000 people were deported to Siberia in June 1941. After the German attack on the Soviet Union, the incipient Soviet political apparatus was either destroyed or retreated eastward. Lithuania was then occupied by Nazi Germany for a little over three years. In 1944, the Soviet Union reoccupied Lithuania. Following World War II and the subsequent suppression of the Lithuanian Forest Brothers, the Soviet authorities executed thousands of resistance fighters and civilians whom they accused of aiding them. Some 300,000 Lithuanians were deported or sentenced to terms in prison camps on political grounds. It is estimated that Lithuania lost almost 780,000 citizens as a result of the Soviet occupation, of these around 440,000 were war refugees.

The estimated death toll in Soviet prisons and camps between 1944 and 1953 was at least 14,000. The estimated death toll among deportees between 1945 and 1958 was 20,000, including 5,000 children.

During the restoration of Lithuanian independence in 1990 and 1991, the Soviet army killed 13 people in Vilnius during the January Events.

Poland

1939–1941

In September 1939, the Red Army invaded eastern Poland and occupied it in accordance with the secret protocols of the Molotov–Ribbentrop Pact. The Soviets later forcefully occupied the Baltic States and parts of Romania, including Bessarabia and Northern Bukovina.

German historian Thomas Urban writes that the Soviet policy towards the people who fell under their control in occupied areas was harsh, showing strong elements of ethnic cleansing. The NKVD task forces followed the Red Army to remove 'hostile elements' from the conquered territories in what was known as the 'revolution by hanging'. Polish historian, Prof. Tomasz Strzembosz, has noted parallels between the Nazi Einsatzgruppen and these Soviet units. Many civilians tried to escape from the Soviet NKVD round-ups; those who failed were taken into custody and afterwards they were deported to Siberia and vanished in the Gulags.

Torture was used on a wide scale in various prisons, especially in those prisons that were located in small towns. Prisoners were scalded with boiling water in Bobrka; in Przemyslany, people's noses, ears, and fingers were cut off and their eyes were also put out; in Czortków, the breasts of female inmates were cut off; and in Drohobycz, victims were bound together with barbed wire. Similar atrocities occurred in Sambor, Stanisławów, Stryj, and Złoczów. According to historian, Prof. Jan T. Gross:

According to sociologist, Prof. Tadeusz Piotrowski, during the years from 1939 to 1941, nearly 1.5 million persons (including both local inhabitants and refugees from German-occupied Poland) were deported from the Soviet-controlled areas of former eastern Poland deep into the Soviet Union, of whom 58.0% were Poles, 19.4% Jews and the remainder other ethnic nationalities. Only a small number of these deportees returned to their homes after the war, when their homelands were annexed by the Soviet Union. According to American professor Carroll Quigley, at least one third of the 320,000 Polish prisoners of war captured by the Red Army in 1939 were murdered.

It's estimated that between 10 and 35 thousand prisoners were killed either in prisons or on prison trail to the Soviet Union in the few days after the 22 June 1941 German attack on the Soviets (prisons: Brygidki, Zolochiv, Dubno, Drohobych, and so on).

1944–1945
In Poland, German Nazi atrocities ended by late 1944, but they were replaced by Soviet oppression with the advance of Red Army forces. Soviet soldiers often engaged in plunder, rape and other crimes against the Poles, causing the population to fear and hate the regime.

Soldiers of the Polish Home Army (Armia Krajowa) were persecuted and imprisoned by Russian forces as a matter of course. Most victims were deported to the gulags in the Donetsk region. In 1945 alone, the number of members of the Polish Underground State who were deported to Siberia and various labor camps in the Soviet Union reached 50,000. Units of the Red Army carried out campaigns against Polish partisans and civilians. During the Augustów chase in 1945, more than 2,000 Poles were captured and about 600 of them are presumed to have died in Soviet custody.
It was a common Soviet practice to accuse their victims of being fascists in order to justify their death sentences. All the perversion of this Soviet tactic lay in the fact that practically all of the accused had in reality been fighting against the forces of Nazi Germany since September 1939. At that time the Soviets were still collaborating with Nazi Germany for more than 20 months before Operation Barbarossa started. Precisely therefore these kinds of Poles were judged capable of resisting the Soviets, in the same way that they had resisted the Nazis. After the War, a more elaborate appearance of justice was given under the jurisdiction of the Polish People's Republic orchestrated by the Soviets in the form of mock trials. These were organized after victims had been arrested under false charges by the NKVD or other Soviet controlled security organisations such as the Ministry of Public Security. At least 6,000 political death sentences were issued, and the majority of them were carried out. It is estimated that over 20,000 people died in Soviet prisons . Famous examples include Witold Pilecki or Emil August Fieldorf.

The attitude of Soviet servicemen towards ethnic Poles was better than their attitude towards the Germans, but it was not entirely better. The scale of rape of Polish women in 1945 led to a pandemic of sexually transmitted diseases. Although the total number of victims remains a matter of guessing, the Polish state archives and statistics of the Ministry of Health indicate that it might have exceeded 100,000.  In Kraków, the Soviet entry into the city was accompanied by mass rapes of Polish women and girls, as well as the plunder of private property by Red Army soldiers. This behavior reached such a scale that even Polish Communists installed by the Soviet Union composed a letter of protest to Joseph Stalin himself, while church Masses were held in expectation of a Soviet withdrawal.

The Red Army was also involved in mass-scale looting in liberated territories.

Finland

Between 1941 and 1944, Soviet partisan units conducted raids deep inside Finnish territory, attacking villages and other civilian targets. In November 2006, photographs showing Soviet atrocities were declassified by the Finnish authorities. These include images of slain women and children. The partisans usually executed their military and civilian prisoners after a minor interrogation.

Around 3,500 Finnish prisoners of war, of whom five were women, were captured by the Red Army. Their mortality rate is estimated to have been about 40 percent. The most common causes of death were hunger, cold and oppressive transportation.

Soviet Union

On 9 August 1937, NKVD order 00485 was adopted to target "subversive activities of Polish intelligence" in the Soviet Union, but was later expanded to also include Latvians, Germans, Estonians, Finns, Greeks, Iranians and Chinese.

Deportation of kulaks 

Large numbers of kulaks regardless of their nationality were resettled to Siberia and Central Asia. According to data from Soviet archives, which were published in 1990, 1,803,392 people were sent to labor colonies and camps in 1930 and 1931, and 1,317,022 reached the destination. Deportations on a smaller scale continued after 1931. Data from the Soviet archives indicates 2.4 million Kulaks were deported from 1930 to 1934. The reported number of kulaks and their relatives who had died in labour colonies from 1932 to 1940 was 389,521. Simon Sebag Montefiore estimated that 15 million kulaks and their families were deported by 1937, during the deportation many people died, but the full number is not known.

Retreat by Soviet forces in 1941
Deportations, summary executions of political prisoners and the burning of foodstocks and villages took place when the Red Army retreated before the advancing Axis forces in 1941. In the Baltic States, Belarus, Ukraine, and Bessarabia, the NKVD and attached units of the Red Army massacred prisoners and political opponents before fleeing from the advancing Axis forces.

Deportation of Greeks

The prosecution of Greeks in the USSR was gradual: at first the authorities shut down the Greek schools, cultural centres, and publishing houses. Then, in 1942, 1944 and 1949, the NKVD indiscriminately arrested all Greek men 16 years old or older. All Greeks who were wealthy or self-employed professionals were sought for prosecution first. This affected mostly Pontic Greeks and other Minorities in the Krasnodar Krai and along the Black Sea coast. By one estimate, around 50,000 Greeks were deported.

On 25 September 1956, MVD Order N 0402 was adopted and defined the removal of restrictions towards the deported peoples in the special settlements. Afterward, the Soviet Greeks started returning to their homes, or emigrating towards Greece.

Deportation of Kalmyks

During the Kalmyk deportations of 1943, codenamed Operation Ulussy (Операция "Улусы"), the deportation of most people of the Kalmyk nationality in the Soviet Union (USSR), and Russian women married to Kalmyks, but excluding Kalmyk women married to men of other nationalities, around half of all (97-98,000) Kalmyk people deported to Siberia died before being allowed to return home in 1957.

Deportation of Crimean Tatars

After the retreat of the Wehrmacht from Crimea, the NKVD deported around 200,000 Crimean Tatars from the peninsula on 18 May 1944.

Deportation of Ingrian Finns

By 1939 the Ingrian Finnish population had decreased to about 50,000, which was about 43% of 1928 population figures, and the Ingrian Finn national district was abolished., Following the German invasion of the Soviet Union and the beginning of the Leningrad Blockade, in early 1942 all 20,000 Ingrian Finns remaining in Soviet-controlled territory were deported to Siberia. Most of the Ingrian Finns together with Votes and Izhorians living in German-occupied territory were evacuated to Finland in 1943–1944. After Finland sued for peace, it was forced to return the evacuees. Soviet authorities did not allow the 55,733 people who had been handed over to settle back in Ingria, and instead deported them to central regions of Russia. The main regions of Ingrian Finns forced settlement were the interior areas of Siberia, Central Russia, and Tajikistan.

Deportation of Chechens and Ingush

In 1943 and 1944, the Soviet government accused several entire ethnic groups of Axis collaboration. As a punishment, several entire ethnic groups were deported, mostly to Central Asia and Siberia into labor camps. The European Parliament described the deportation of Chechens and Ingush, where around a quarter people perished, an act of genocide in 2004:

Germany

According to historian Norman Naimark, statements in Soviet military newspapers and the orders of the Soviet high command were jointly responsible for the excesses of the Red Army. Propaganda proclaimed that the Red Army had entered Germany as an avenger to punish all Germans.

Some historians dispute this, referring to an order issued on 19 January 1945, which required the prevention of mistreatment of civilians. An order of the military council of the 1st Belorussian Front, signed by Marshal Rokossovsky, ordered the shooting of looters and rapists at the scene of the crime. An order issued by Stavka on 20 April 1945 said that there was a need to maintain good relations with German civilians in order to decrease resistance and bring a quicker end to hostilities.

Murders of civilians

On several occasions during World War II, Soviet soldiers set fire to buildings, villages, or parts of cities, and they used deadly force against locals who attempted to put out the fires. Most Red Army atrocities took place only in what was regarded as hostile territory (see Przyszowice massacre). Soldiers of the Red Army, together with members of the NKVD, frequently looted German transport trains in Poland in 1944 and 1945.

For the Germans, the organized evacuation of civilians before the advancing Red Army was delayed by the Nazi government, so as not to demoralize the troops, who were by now fighting in their own country. Nazi propaganda — originally meant to stiffen civil resistance by describing in gory and embellished detail Red Army atrocities such as the Nemmersdorf massacre — often backfired and created panic. Whenever possible, as soon as the Wehrmacht retreated, local civilians began to flee westward on their own initiative.

Fleeing before the advancing Red Army, large numbers of the inhabitants of the German provinces of East Prussia, Silesia, and Pomerania died during the evacuations, some from cold and starvation, some during combat operations. A significant percentage of this death toll, however, occurred when evacuation columns encountered units of the Red Army. Civilians were run over by tanks, shot, or otherwise murdered. Women and young girls were raped and left to die.

In addition, fighter bombers of the Soviet air force flew bombing and strafing missions that targeted columns of refugees.

Although mass executions of civilians by the Red Army were seldom publicly reported, there is a known incident in Treuenbrietzen, where at least 88 male inhabitants were rounded up and shot on 1 May 1945. The incident took place after a victory celebration in which numerous girls from Treuenbrietzen were raped and a Red Army lieutenant-colonel was shot by an unknown assailant. Some sources claim that as many as 1,000 civilians may have been executed during the incident.

The first mayor of the Charlottenburg district of Berlin, Walter Kilian, appointed by the Soviets after the war ended, reported extensive looting by Red Army soldiers in the area: "Individuals, department stores, shops, apartments ... all were robbed blind."

In the Soviet occupation zone, members of the SED reported to Stalin that looting and rape by Soviet soldiers could result in a negative reaction by the German population towards the Soviet Union and the future of socialism in East Germany. Stalin is said to have angrily reacted: "I shall not tolerate anybody dragging the honour of the Red Army through the mud."

Accordingly, all evidence — such as reports, photos and other documents of looting, rape, the burning down of farms and villages by the Red Army — was deleted from all archives in the future GDR.

A study published by the German government in 1974 estimated the number of German civilian victims of crimes during expulsion of Germans after World War II between 1945 and 1948 to be over 600,000, with about 400,000 deaths in the areas east of Oder and Neisse (ca. 120,000 in acts of direct violence, mostly by Soviet troops but also by Poles, 60,000 in Polish and 40,000 in Soviet concentration camps or prisons mostly from hunger and disease, and 200,000 deaths among civilian deportees to forced labor of Germans in the Soviet Union), 130,000 in Czechoslovakia (thereof 100,000 in camps) and 80,000 in Yugoslavia (thereof 15,000 to 20,000 from violence outside of and in camps and 59,000 deaths from hunger and disease in camps). These figures do not include up to 125,000 civilian deaths in the Battle of Berlin. About 22,000 civilians are estimated to have been killed during the fighting in Berlin only.

Mass rapes

Western estimates of the traceable number of rape victims range from two hundred thousand to two million. Following the Winter Offensive of 1945, mass rape by Soviet males occurred in all major cities taken by the Red Army. Women were gang raped by as many as several dozen soldiers during the liberation of Poland. In some cases victims who did not hide in the basements all day were raped up to 15 times. According to historian Antony Beevor, following the Red Army's capture of Berlin in 1945, Soviet troops raped German women and girls as young as eight years old. 
 	
The explanation of "revenge" is disputed by Beevor, at least with regard to the mass rapes. Beevor has written that Red Army soldiers also raped Soviet and Polish women liberated from concentration camps, and he contends that this undermines the revenge explanation,  they were often committed by rear echelon units.

According to Norman Naimark, after the summer of 1945, Soviet soldiers caught raping civilians usually received punishments ranging from arrest to execution. However, Naimark contends that the rapes continued until the winter of 1947–48, when Soviet occupation authorities finally confined troops to strictly guarded posts and camps. Naimark concluded that "The social psychology of women and men in the Soviet zone of occupation was marked by the crime of rape from the first days of occupation, through the founding of the GDR in the fall of 1949, until, one could argue, the present."

According to Richard Overy, the Russians refused to acknowledge Soviet war crimes, partly "because they felt that much of it was justified vengeance against an enemy who committed much worse, and partly it was because they were writing the victors' history."

Hungary
According to researcher and author Krisztián Ungváry, some 38,000 civilians were killed during the Siege of Budapest: about 13,000 from military action and 25,000 from starvation, disease and other causes. Included in the latter figure are about 15,000 Jews, largely victims of executions by Nazi SS and Arrow Cross Party death squads. Ungváry writes that when the Soviets finally claimed victory, they initiated an orgy of violence, including the wholesale theft of anything they could lay their hands on, random executions and mass rape. Estimates of the number of rape victims vary from 5,000 to 200,000. According to Norman Naimark, Hungarian girls were kidnapped and taken to Red Army quarters, where they were imprisoned, repeatedly raped and sometimes murdered.

Even embassy staff from neutral countries were captured and raped, as was documented when Soviet soldiers attacked the Swedish legation in Germany.

A report by the Swiss legation in Budapest describes the Red Army's entry into the city:

According to historian James Mark, memories and opinions of the Red Army in Hungary are mixed.

Romania

The Soviet Union also committed war crimes in Romania or against Romanians from the beginning of the occupation of Bessarabia and Northern Bukovina in 1940 all the way to the German invasion in 1941, and later from the expulsion of the Germans in the region until 1958. One example was the Fântâna Albă massacre, in which 44–3,000 Romanians were killed by the Soviet Border Troops and the NKVD while attempting to escape to Romania. Such event has been referred to as the "Romanian Katyn".

Another infamous massacre committed by Soviet troops was the Lunca massacre, where soviet border troops opened fire against several Romanian civilians attempting to escape into Romania, killing 600 of them, only 57 managed to escape, with another 44 being arrested and tried as "members of a counter-revolutionary organization", 12 of them were sentenced to death, with the rest being sentenced to 10 years forced labour and 5 years loss of civil rights, the family members of those arrested and shot would later be arrested and sent to Siberia and Central Asia

During the occupation, the Soviet government and army deported thousands of Romanian civilians from the occupied regions into "special settlements". According to a secret Soviet Ministry of Interior report dated December 1965, 46,000 people were deported from the Moldavian Soviet Socialist Republic for the period 1940−1953.

Religious persecution was also widespread, the Soviet government sought to exterminate all forms of organized religion in its occupied territories, often persecuting the Catholic, Orthodox, Muslim and Jewish churches, the Soviet political police arrested numerous priests, with others being arrested and interrogated by the Soviet NKVD itself, then deported to the interior of the USSR, and killed.<ref>Martiri pentru Hristos, din România, în perioada regimului comunist, Editura Institutului Biblic şi de Misiune al Bisericii Ortodoxe Române, București, 2007, pp. 34–35.</ref>

Thousands of Transylvanian Saxons would later be deported from 1944 to 1949 under Soviet occupation, with hundreds or even thousands dying on their way to camps in Siberia and Central Asia before being able to come back to their home country.

Yugoslavia
According to Yugoslav politician Milovan Djilas, at least 121 cases of rape were documented, 111 of which also involved murder. A total of 1,204 cases of looting with assault were also documented. Djilas described these figures as, "hardly insignificant if it is borne in mind that the Red Army crossed only the northeastern corner of Yugoslavia".Naimark (1995), pp. 70–71. This caused concern to the Yugoslav communist partisans, who feared that stories of crimes committed by their Soviet allies would weaken their standing among the population.

Djilas writes that in response, Yugoslav partisan leader Joseph Broz Tito summoned the chief of the Soviet military mission, General Korneev, and formally protested. Despite having been invited "as a comrade", Korneev exploded at them for offering "such insinuations" against the Red Army. Djilas, who was present at the meeting, spoke up and explained the British Army had never engaged in "such excesses" while liberating the other regions of Yugoslavia. General Korneev responded by screaming, "I protest most sharply at this insult given to the Red Army by comparing it with the armies of capitalist countries."

The meeting with Korneev not only "ended without results", it also caused Stalin to personally attack Djilas during his next visit to the Kremlin. In tears, Stalin denounced "the Yugoslav Army and how it was administered." He then "spoke agitatedly about the sufferings of the Red Army and the horrors that it was forced to endure while it was fighting through thousands of kilometers of devastated country." Stalin climaxed with the words, "And such an Army was insulted by no one else but Djilas! Djilas, of whom I could least have expected such a thing, a man whom I received so well! And an Army which did not spare its blood for you! Does Djilas, who is himself a writer, not know what human suffering and the human heart are? Can't he understand it if a soldier who has crossed thousands of kilometers through blood and fire and death has fun with a woman or takes some trifle?"

According to Djilas, the Soviet refusal to address protests against Red Army war crimes in Yugoslavia enraged Tito's government and it was a contributing factor in Yugoslavia's subsequent exit from the Soviet Bloc.

Czechoslovakia (1945)
Slovak communist leader Vlado Clementis complained to Marshal Ivan Konev about the behavior of Soviet troops in Czechoslovakia. Konev's response was to claim it was done mainly by Red Army deserters.

China

During the invasion of Manchuria, Soviet and Mongolian soldiers attacked and raped Japanese civilians, often encouraged by the local Chinese population who were resentful of Japanese rule. The local Chinese population sometimes even joined in these attacks against the Japanese population with the Soviet soldiers. In one famous example, during the Gegenmiao massacre, Soviet soldiers, encouraged by the local Chinese population, raped and massacred over one thousand Japanese women and children. Property of the Japanese were also looted by the Soviet soldiers and Chinese. Many Japanese women married themselves to local Manchurian men to protect themselves from persecution by Soviet soldiers. These Japanese women mostly married Chinese men and became known as "stranded war wives" (zanryu fujin).

Following the invasion of the Japanese puppet state of Manchukuo (Manchuria), the Soviets laid claim to valuable Japanese materials and industrial equipment in the region. A foreigner witnessed Soviet troops, formerly stationed in Berlin, who were allowed by the Soviet military to go at the city "for three days of rape and pillage." Most of Mukden was gone. Convict soldiers were then used to replace them; it was testified that they "stole everything in sight, broke up bathtubs and toilets with hammers, pulled electric-light wiring out of the plaster, built fires on the floor and either burned down the house or at least a big hole in the floor, and in general behaved completely like savages."

According to some British and American sources, the Soviets made it a policy to loot and rape civilians in Manchuria. In Harbin, the Chinese posted slogans such as "Down with Red Imperialism!" Soviet forces faced some protests by Chinese communist party leaders against the looting and rapes committed by troops in Manchuria. There were several incidences, where Chinese police forces in Manchuria arrested or even killed Soviet troops for various crimes, leading to some conflicts between the Soviet and Chinese authorities in Manchuria.

Russian historian Konstantin Asmolov argues that such Western accounts of Soviet violence against civilians in the Far East are exaggerations of isolated incidents and the documents of the time don't support the claims of mass crimes. Asmolov also claims that the Soviets, unlike the Germans and the Japanese, prosecuted their soldiers and officers for such acts. Indeed, the incidence of rape committed in the Far East was far less than the number of incidents committed by Soviet soldiers in Europe.

Japan

The Soviet Army committed crimes against the Japanese civilian populations and surrendered military personnel in the closing stages of World War II during the assaults on Sakhalin and Kuril Islands.

On August 10, 1945, Soviet forces carried out fierce naval bombardment and artillery strikes against civilians awaiting evacuation as well as Japanese installations in Maoka. Nearly 1,000 civilians were killed by the invading  forces.

During the evacuation of the Kuriles and Karafuto, civilian convoys were attacked by Soviet submarines in the Aniva Gulf. Soviet Leninets-class submarine L-12 and L-19 sank two Japanese refugee transport ships Ogasawara Maru and Taito Maru while also damaging No.2 Shinko Maru on August 22, 7 days after Hirohito had announced Japan's unconditional surrender. Over 2,400 civilians were killed.

Treatment of prisoners of war
Although the Soviet Union had not formally signed the Hague Convention, it considered itself bound by the convention's provisions.Isvestiya,  28 April 1942.

Throughout the Second World War, the Wehrmacht War Crimes Bureau collected and investigated reports of crimes against the Axis POWs. According to Cuban-American writer Alfred de Zayas, "For the entire duration of the Russian campaign, reports of torture and murder of German prisoners did not cease. The War Crimes Bureau had five major sources of information: (1) captured enemy papers, especially orders, reports of operations, and propaganda leaflets; (2) intercepted radio and wireless messages; (3) testimony of Soviet prisoners of war; (4) testimony of captured Germans who had escaped; and (5) testimony of Germans who saw the corpses or mutilated bodies of executed prisoners of war. From 1941 to 1945 the Bureau compiled several thousand depositions, reports, and captured papers which, if nothing else, indicate that the killing of German prisoners of war upon capture or shortly after their interrogation was not an isolated occurrence. Documents relating to the war in France, Italy, and North Africa contain some reports on the deliberate killing of German prisoners of war, but there can be no comparison with the events on the Eastern Front."

In a November 1941 report, the Wehrmacht War Crimes Bureau accused the Red Army of employing "a terror policy... against defenseless German soldiers that have fallen into its hands and against members of the German medical corps. At the same time... it has made use of the following means of camouflage: in a Red Army order that bears the approval of the Council of People's Commissars, dated 1 July 1941, the norms of international law are made public, which the Red Army in the spirit of the Hague Regulations on Land Warfare are supposed to follow... This... Russian order probably had very little distribution, and surely it has not been followed at all. Otherwise the unspeakable crimes would not have occurred."

According to the depositions, Soviet massacres of German, Italian, Spanish, and other Axis POWs were often incited by unit Commissars, who claimed to be acting under orders from Stalin and the Politburo. Other evidence cemented the War Crimes Bureau's belief that Stalin had given secret orders about the massacre of POWs.

During the winter of 1941–42, the Red Army captured approximately 10,000 German soldiers each month, but the death rate became so high that the absolute number of prisoners decreased (or was bureaucratically reduced).

Soviet sources list the deaths of 474,967 of the 2,652,672 German Armed Forces taken prisoner in the War. Dr. Rüdiger Overmans believes that it seems entirely plausible, while not provable, that an additional German military personnel listed as missing actually died in Soviet custody as POWs, putting the estimates of the actual death toll of German POW in the USSR at about 1.0 million.

Massacre of Feodosia
Soviet soldiers rarely bothered to treat wounded German POWs. A particularly infamous example took place after the Crimean city of Feodosia was briefly recaptured by Soviet forces on December 29, 1942. 160 wounded soldiers had been left in military hospitals by the retreating Wehrmacht. After the Germans retook Feodosia, it was learned that every wounded soldier had been massacred by Red Army, Navy, and NKVD personnel. Some had been shot in their hospital beds, others repeatedly bludgeoned to death, still others were found to have been thrown from hospital windows before being repeatedly drenched with freezing water until they died of hypothermia.

Massacre of Grishchino
The Massacre of Grischino was committed by an armoured division of the Red Army in February 1943 in the eastern Ukrainian towns of Krasnoarmeyskoye, Postyschevo and Grischino. The Wehrmacht Untersuchungsstelle also known as WuSt (Wehrmacht criminal investigating authority), announced that among the victims were 406 soldiers of the Wehrmacht, 58 members of the Organisation Todt (including two Danish nationals), 89 Italian soldiers, 9 Romanian soldiers, 4 Hungarian soldiers, 15 German civil officials, 7 German civilian workers and 8 Ukrainian volunteers.

The places were overrun by the Soviet 4th Guards Tank Corps on the night of 10 and 11 February 1943. After the reconquest by the 5th SS Panzer Division Wiking with the support of 333 Infantry Division and the 7th Panzer Division on 18 February 1943 the Wehrmacht soldiers discovered numerous deaths. Many of the bodies were horribly mutilated, ears and noses cut off and genital organs amputated and stuffed into their mouths. Breasts of some of the nurses were cut off, the women being brutally raped. A German military judge who was at the scene stated in an interview during the 1970s that he saw a female body with her legs spread-eagled and a broomstick rammed into her genitals. In the cellar of the main train station around 120 Germans were herded into a large storage room and then mowed down with machine guns.

Postwar
Some German prisoners were released soon after the war. Many others, however, remained in the GULAG long after the surrender of Nazi Germany. Among the most famous German POWs to die in Soviet captivity was Captain Wilm Hosenfeld, who died of injuries, sustained possibly under torture, in a concentration camp near Stalingrad in 1952. In 2009, Captain Hosenfeld was posthumously honored by the State of Israel for his role in saving Jewish lives during The Holocaust. Similar was the fate of Swedish diplomat and OSS operative Raoul Wallenberg.

After World War II

Hungarian Revolution (1956)

According to the United Nations Report of the Special Committee on the problem of Hungary (1957): "Soviet tanks fired indiscriminately at every building from which they believed themselves to be under fire." The UN commission received numerous reports of Soviet mortar and artillery fire into inhabited quarters in the Buda section of the city, despite no return fire, and of "haphazard shooting at defenseless passers-by."

 Czechoslovakia 1968 

During the invasion of Czechoslovakia by the Warsaw Pact, 72 Czechs and Slovaks were killed (19 in Slovakia), 266 seriously wounded and another 436 lightly wounded.Williams (1997), p. 158.

Afghanistan (1979–1989)

Scholars Mohammad Kakar, W. Michael Reisman and Charles Norchi believe that the Soviet Union was guilty of committing a genocide in Afghanistan. The army of the Soviet Union killed large numbers of Afghans to suppress their resistance. Up to 2 million Afghans were killed by the Soviet forces and their proxies. In one notable incident the Soviet Army committed mass killing of civilians in the summer of 1980. One notable war crime was the Laghman massacre in April 1985 in the villages of Kas-Aziz-Khan, Charbagh, Bala Bagh, Sabzabad, Mamdrawer, Haider Khan and Pul-i-Joghi in the Laghman Province. At least 500 civilians were killed. In the Kulchabat, Bala Karz and Mushkizi massacre on 12 October 1983 the Red Army gathered 360 people at the village square and shot them, including 20 girls and over a dozen older people. The Rauzdi massacre and Padkhwab-e Shana massacre were also documented.

In order to separate the mujahideen from the local populations and eliminate their support, the Soviet army killed and drove off civilians, and used scorched earth tactics to prevent their return. They used booby traps, mines, and chemical substances throughout the country. The Soviet army indiscriminately killed combatants and noncombatants to ensure submission by the local populations. The provinces of Nangarhar, Ghazni, Lagham, Kunar, Zabul, Qandahar, Badakhshan, Lowgar, Paktia and Paktika witnessed extensive depopulation programmes by the Soviet forces. The Soviet forces abducted Afghan women in helicopters while flying in the country in search of mujahideen. In November 1980 a number of such incidents had taken place in various parts of the country, including Laghman and Kama. Soviet soldiers as well as KhAD agents kidnapped young women from the city of Kabul and the areas of Darul Aman and Khair Khana, near the Soviet garrisons, to rape them. Women who were taken and raped by Russian soldiers were considered 'dishonoured' by their families if they returned home. Deserters from the Soviet Army in 1984 claimed that they had heard of Afghan women being raped. The rape of Afghan women by Soviet troops was common and 11.8 percent of the Soviet war criminals in Afghanistan were convicted for the offence of rape. There was an outcry against the press in the Soviet Union for depicting the Russian "war heroes" as "murderers", "aggressors", "rapists" and "junkies".

 Pressure in Azerbaijan (1988–1991) 

Black January, also known as Black Saturday or the January Massacre, was a violent crackdown in Baku on  19–20 January 1990, pursuant to a state of emergency during the dissolution of the Soviet Union.

In a resolution of 22 January 1990, the Supreme Soviet of Azerbaijan SSR declared that the decree of the Presidium of the Supreme Soviet of the USSR of 19 January, used to impose emergency rule in Baku and military deployment, constituted an act of aggression. Black January is associated with the rebirth of the Azerbaijan Republic. It was one of the occasions during the glasnost and perestroika era in which the USSR used force against dissidents.

War crimes trials and legal prosecution
In 1995, Latvian courts sentenced former KGB officer Alfons Noviks to life in prison for genocide due to forced deportations in the 1940s.

In 2003, August Kolk (born 1924), an Estonian national, and Petr Kislyiy (born 1921), a Russian national, were convicted of crimes against humanity by Estonian courts and each sentenced to eight years in prison. They were found guilty of deportations of Estonians in 1949. Kolk and Kislyiy lodged a complaint at the European Court of Human Rights, alleging that the Criminal Code of 1946 of the Russian Soviet Federative Socialist Republic (SFSR) was valid at the time, applicable also in Estonia, and that the said Code had not provided for punishment of crimes against humanity. Their appeal was rejected since the court found that Resolution 95 of the United Nations General Assembly, adopted on 11 December 1946, confirmed deportations of civilians as a crime against humanity under international law.

In 2004, Vassili Kononov, a Soviet partisan during World War II, was convicted by Supreme Court of Latvia as a war criminal for killing three women, one of whom was pregnant."CASE OF KONONOV v. LATVIA", European Court of Human Rights. 17 May 2010. Retrieved 18 May 2010. He is the only former Soviet partisan convicted of crimes against humanity.

On 27 March 2019, Lithuania convicted 67 former Soviet military and KGB officials who were given sentences of between four and 14 years for the crackdown against Lithuanian civilians in January 1991. Only two were present—Yuriy Mel, a former Soviet tank officer, and Gennady Ivanov, a former Soviet munitions officer—while the other were sentenced in absentia and are hiding in Russia.

In popular culture

Film
 A Woman in Berlin  (2008) depicts the mass sexual assaults committed by Soviet soldiers in the Soviet Zone of Occupied Germany. It is based on the diary of Marta Hillers.
 Admiral (2008), a film set during the Russian Civil War, depicts Red soldiers and sailors committing numerous massacres of former members of the Imperial Russian Navy's officer corps.
 The Beast (1988) a film set during the Soviet–Afghan War, depicts Red Army war crimes against civilian noncombatants and a Pashtun clan's quest for revenge.
 Charlie Wilson's War (2007), set during the Soviet–Afghan War, accuses the Soviet State of systematic genocide against Afghan civilians. It is mentioned that Soviet forces are leaving no one alive and are even slaughtering livestock in order to starve the Afghan people into submission.
 Katyń (2007), depicts the Katyn massacre through the eyes of its victims and the decades long battle by their families to learn the truth.

Literature
 Prussian Nights (1974) a war poem by Alexander Solzhenitsyn. The narrator, a Red Army officer, approves of the troops' crimes as revenge for Nazi atrocities in Russia, and hopes to take part in the plundering himself. The poem describes the gang-rape of a Polish woman whom the Red Army soldiers had mistaken for a German. According to a review for The New York Times, Solzhenitsyn wrote the  poem in trochaic tetrameter, "in imitation of, and argument with the most famous Russian war poem, Aleksandr Tvardovsky's Vasili Tyorkin."
 Apricot Jam and Other Stories (2010) by Alexander Solzhenitsyn. In a short story about Marshal Georgii Zhukov's futile attempts at writing his memoirs, the retired Marshal reminisces about serving against the peasant uprising in Tambov Province. He recalls Mikhail Tukhachevsky's arrival to take command of the campaign and his first address to his men. He announced that total war and scorched earth tactics are to be used against civilians who assist or even sympathize with the peasant rebels. Zhukov proudly recalls how Tukhachevsky's tactics were adopted and succeeded in breaking the uprising. In the process, however, they virtually depopulated the surrounding countryside.
 A Man without Breath (2013) by Philip Kerr. A 1993 Bernie Gunther thriller which delves into the Wehrmacht War Crimes Bureau's investigations of Soviet war crimes. Kerr noted in his Afterward that the Wehrmacht War Crimes Bureau continued to exist until 1945. It has been written about in the book of the same name by Alfred M. de Zayas, published by the University of Nebraska Press in 1989. .

Art
 On 12 October 2013 a then 26-year-old Polish art student, Jerzy Bohdan Szumczyk, erected a movable statue next to the Soviet World War II memorial in the Polish city of Gdańsk. The statue depicted a Soviet soldier attempting to rape a pregnant woman; pulling her hair with one hand whilst pushing a pistol into her mouth. Authorities removed the artwork because it had been erected without an official permit, but there was widespread interest in many online publications. The act promoted an angry reaction from the Russian ambassador in Poland.

 See also 

 Allied war crimes during World War II
 Anti-communist mass killings
 Antisemitism in the Soviet Union
 Crimes against humanity under communist regimes
 Destruction battalions
 Evacuation of East Prussia
 Excess mortality in the Soviet Union under Joseph Stalin
 Forced labor of Germans in the Soviet Union
 German war crimes
 Human rights in the Soviet Union
 Italian war crimes
 Japanese POWs in the Soviet Union
 Japanese war crimes
 List of massacres in the Soviet Union
 List of Soviet Union perpetrated war crimes
 Mass graves in the Soviet Union
 Mass killings under communist regimes
 Mass operations of the NKVD
 Military history of the Soviet Union
 Military occupations by the Soviet Union
 Nemmersdorf massacre
 NKVD prisoner massacres
 Operation Frühlingserwachen
 Population transfer in the Soviet Union
 Racism in the Soviet Union
 Red Terror
 Russian war crimes
 United States war crimes
 War crimes and atrocities of the Waffen-SS
 War crimes of the Wehrmacht

Notes

 References 

 Sources 
 Marta Hillers, A Woman in Berlin: Six Weeks in the Conquered City Translated by Anthes Bell, 
 Antony Beevor, Berlin: The Downfall 1945, Penguin Books, 2002, 
 Bergstrom, Christer (2007). Barbarossa – The Air Battle: July–December 1941. London: Chevron/Ian Allan. . Bergstrom does make a point of noting that crimes against PoWs, and specifically against captured aircrew, were pretty universal in World War II.
 Steve Hall and Lionel Quinlan (2000). KG55: Greif Geshwader. Walton on Thames: Red Kite. 
 Max Hastings, Armageddon: The Battle for Germany, 1944–1945, Chapter 10: Blood and Ice: East Prussia 
 Fisch, Bernhard, Nemmersdorf, Oktober 1944. Was in Ostpreußen tatsächlich geschah. Berlin: 1997. . (about most of the Nemmersdorf atrocity having been set up by Goebbels)
 John Toland, The Last 100 Days, Chapter Two: Five Minutes before Midnight 
 Norman M. Naimark, The Russians in Germany: A History of the Soviet Zone of Occupation, 1945–1949. Harvard University Press, 1995. 
 Catherine Merridale, Ivan's War, the Red Army 1939–1945, London: Faber and Faber, 2005, 
 Alfred-Maurice de Zayas, The Wehrmacht War Crimes Bureau, 1939–1945 (in Wikipedia). Preface by Professor Howard Levie. Lincoln: University of Nebraska Press, 1989. . New revised edition with Picton Press, Rockland, Maine, .
 Alfred-Maurice de Zayas, A Terrible Revenge. The Ethnic Cleansing of the East European Germans, 1944–1950, St. Martin's Press, New York, 1994, 
 Elizabeth B. Walter, Barefoot in the Rubble 1997, 

 External links 

 The forgotten victims of WWII: Masculinities and rape in Berlin, 1945, James W. Messerschmidt, University of Southern Maine
 Book Review: A Woman in Berlin: Eight Weeks in the Conquered City'', 
 Laws of War: Laws and Customs of War on Land (Hague IV); October 18, 1907
 Swiss legation report of the Russian invasion of Hungary in the spring of 1945
 German rape victims find a voice at last, Kate Connolly, The Observer, June 23, 2002
 "They raped every German female from eight to 80", Antony Beevor, The Guardian, 1 May 2002
 Excerpt, Chapter one The Struggle for Europe: The Turbulent History of a Divided Continent 1945–2002 – William I. Hitchcock – 2003 –  ( The occupation of East Prussia)
 Description of the atrocities of the Red Army in East Prussia, quotations from Ilya Ehrenburg, poems by anti-cruelty Red Army officers and details of suicides and rapings of German women and children in East Prussia.
 Book Review: The Siege of Budapest: 100 Days in World War II
 HNet review of The Russians in Germany: A History of the Soviet Zone of Occupation, 1945–1949.
 Mark Ealey: As World War II entered its final stages the belligerent powers committed one heinous act after another History News Network (Focus on the Asian front)
 27 Jan 2002 on-line article regarding author Antony Beevor's references to Soviet rapes in Germany

 
Aftermath of World War II in the Soviet Union
War crimes committed by country
Crimes against humanity
-